The electoral division of Pembroke is one of the 15 electorates or 'seats' in the Tasmanian Legislative Council or upper house. It is located on Hobart's Eastern Shore (east side of the Derwent River) and includes a number of suburbs; Risdon Vale, Geilston Bay, Rose Bay, Lindisfarne, Warrane, Mornington, Bellerive, Howrah and Tranmere. In earlier times, the division included most of the east coast of Tasmania as far north as Bicheno, including the Tasman Peninsula.

The electorate takes its name from a county which was created in Tasmania by early British settlers. The division and the former county both took their name from Pembrokeshire in Wales.

Members

See also

 Pembroke Land District
 Tasmanian House of Assembly

References

External links
Parliament of Tasmania
Tasmanian Electoral Commission - Legislative Council

Pembroke
Southern Tasmania